The Madan Puraskar is a literary honor in Nepal which Madan Puraskar Guthi confers annually for an outstanding book in the Nepali language published within the calendar year. It is considered the most prestigious literature award in Nepal. It is awarded on the day of Ghatasthapana every year alongside Jagadamba Shree Puraskar.

History 
The award was established by daughter in law of Prime Minister Chandra Shumsher JBR, Queen Jagadamba Kumari Devi, in memory of her husband late General Madan Shumsher JBR, on 26 September 1955. Since then it has been presented every year, except in 1974 and 1976. At the time of its establishment, the award prize was रु 4,000. On the Golden–Jubilee year 2005, the award prize was increased to रु 400,000.

List of Winners and Short list by year

2015 – 2021

2000 – 2014 
Before 2014 (2071 BS), shortlist was not published.

1986– 1999

1971 – 1985

1956 – 1970

Trivia 

 First winners: Satya Mohan Joshi, Chittaranjan Nepali, Balram Joshi
 First woman winner: Parijat
 First novel to win the prize: Mann
 First short story anthology winner: Naya Sadak ko Geet
First poetry collection winner: Bishfot
Most number of wins: Satya Mohan Joshi (3 times)

See also 
 Madan Puraskar Pustakalaya
 Nepali language
Shri Durbar
Jagadamba Kumari Devi
Jagadamba Shree Purasakar

References

Notes

External links
 
 Complete List of Madan Puraskar Winners
 About Madan Puraskar Pustakalaya in PAN

 


1955 establishments in Nepal
Awards established in 1955
Nepalese culture
Nepalese literary awards